100 Transcendental Studies by Kaikhosru Shapurji Sorabji are a series of 100 piano études written between 1940 and 1944. Swedish pianist Fredrik Ullén has released all 100 études on BIS Records.

Description 
The études vary greatly in style, character, and length, with the shortest running about a minute and the longest running approximately 45 minutes. According to the Sorabji Archive, the following études have yet to be premiered: Nos. 27, 33, 39, 42, 45–48, 51, 53–58, 60–64, 68, 74, 82, 87, 90, 91 and 93.

Sorabji almost certainly intended for these Études to be compared with Franz Liszt's Transcendental Études. The style of Sorabji's études is typical of his work, consisting of atonal melodies, dissonant harmonies, complex polyrhythms, rapid changes in texture and mood, and extreme technical challenges for the pianist to work through. Taken individually, these are some of the shortest pieces Sorabji ever composed. A complete list of the études is included below. World première pianists and dates from The Sorabji Archive.

World première pianists and dates

References

Notes

Compositions for solo piano
Compositions by Kaikhosru Shapurji Sorabji
Piano études